HMS Camberley was a Hunt class minesweeper of the Royal Navy from World War I. She operated as a tender at the Navigation School.

See also
 Camberley, Surrey

References
 

 

Hunt-class minesweepers (1916)
Royal Navy ship names
1918 ships